Dayton High School is a public secondary school located in Dayton in Liberty County in southeastern Texas, United States. The school serves approximately 1,600 students in grades 9-12.

Dayton High School is the only high school in the Dayton Independent School District, serving the cities of Dayton, Dayton Lakes and Kenefick, and the unincorporated communities of Eastgate, Stilson, as well a significant portion of Old River-Winfree. 

The school has over 100 classroom teachers, 20 office and support staff, 4 principals, 4 counselors, and 2 curriculum coordinators.  Its dual enrollment students are serviced by Lee College, a community college located 27 miles away, in Baytown, Texas

The current head principal is Geoff McCracken. Chris Conner serves as the assistant principal for students in the 9th grade, with Shayann Johnson, Thomas Swagger, and Savannah Zinter being the assistant principals for students in the 10th, 11th, and 12th grades with surnames beginning with A-Gr, Gu-Pe, and Pi-Z respectively. Travis Young served as head principal for many years prior to McCracken's placement in his current position.

Dayton High school offers a school band program for students in all grade levels. It is led by Kevin Heckaman and has ranked in regional UIL music competitions ever since Heckaman took lead of the program.

Notable alumni
John Otto (Class of 1966), member of the Texas House of Representatives 2005-2017 representing Liberty, San Jacinto, and Walker counties
Don Brown (Class of 1955), football player who played one season as a running back in the American Football League
Aaron Ripkowski (Class of 2011), American football fullback for the Green Bay Packers of the National Football League (NFL).
Julie Kocurek (Class of 1983), Texas state court judge, having served as the presiding judge of the 390th District Court in Austin, Texas since 1999.
Frances Northcutt (Class of 1961), first female engineer to work in NASA's Mission Control during Apollo 8. Lunar crater Poppy was named in her honor for her work and pioneering in the Apollo Program.
Mike Mabry, American football center

References 

Schools in Liberty County, Texas
Public high schools in Texas